Chiara Kreuzer ( Hölzl, born 18 July 1997) is an Austrian ski jumper.

Career
Kreuzer's debut in the FIS Ski Jumping World Cup took place in 2012 in Lillehammer. Her individual best result is an 11th place at the 2018 Winter Olympic Games. At the 2013 FIS Nordic World Ski Championships in Val di Fiemme, Kreuzer won the silver medal with the Austrian team (Gregor Schlierenzauer, Thomas Morgenstern, and Jacqueline Seifriedsberger) in the mixed event at the normal hill competition.

She competed in the Winter Olympic Games in both 2014 and 2018.

World Cup

Standings

Wins

References

External links 

1997 births
Living people
Austrian female ski jumpers
Olympic ski jumpers of Austria
Ski jumpers at the 2014 Winter Olympics
Ski jumpers at the 2018 Winter Olympics
Sportspeople from Salzburg (state)
FIS Nordic World Ski Championships medalists in ski jumping
People from St. Johann im Pongau District
21st-century Austrian women